Marcellus was launched in Boston in 1811. She traded between Liverpool and the United States, all the while retaining American ownership though possibly with British registry. It is not entirely clear how her owners dealt with the War of 1812. Lloyd's Lists ship arrival and departure data does show a voyage between Lisbon and Baltimore during that period. She was lost in 1820 on a voyage to Bombay.

Career
Marcellus first appeared in Lloyd's Register (LR) in 1812.

Fate
Marcellus, Ahorn, master, wrecked on 13 August 1820 on Saugor Island, in the River Hooghly. She was sailing to Calcutta from Holland. Her cargo was saved.

Citations and references
Citations

References
 

1811 ships
Ships built in Boston
Maritime incidents in August 1820